Hanad Zakaria Warsame (October 16, 1952 – July 8, 2008) was a doctor, born to a Somali father and an Ethiopian mother.
He was the 1st President of EVIFF and former senior congressman of the ONLF from 1989 until his assassination on July 8, 2008.

Hanad grew up in Somalia with his father and twin brother. His father Mahmoud Aden Warsame's mother is the daughter of Yusuf Dheere Mohamed Sugaal founder of the Western Somali Liberation Front. He joined the ONLF army encouraged by his Pan-Somalist father but Hanad later quit and pursued medical studies and became doctor in Jijiga.

He co founded EVIFF with Ayaan Aycad who is the daughter of an Ethiopian Pan-Somalist named Facilides. She succeeded him on 10 July 2008.

Sources
BBC world news article, 2008''

Somalian anti-communists
People murdered in Ethiopia
1952 births
2008 deaths
People from Mogadishu
Assassinated Somalian politicians
Somalian people of Ethiopian descent
Somalian murder victims
Somali independence activists
20th-century Somalian physicians